The Swiss Institute for Management and Hospitality (SWISS IM&H) is an English-medium culinary and hospitality management school in Switzerland. Swiss Institute for Management and Hospitality is located in the city of Weggis, a municipality in the district of Lucerne in the canton of Lucerne. The school offers Culinary Management Courses and a bachelor's degree (BBA) & Masters's Degree (MBA) in Hospitality Management.

Campus & Facilities 

In January 2012, SWISS IM&H extended the space and facilities at Kantonstrasse 85, 6353 Weggis to all of level 4 of the building, which is situated by the shore of Lake Lucerne. After each semester, students are allowed to work for 4–6 months in the hospitality industry. SWISS IM&H offers diplomas up to an MBA to students from the age of 18.

Partnerships 

British Hospitality Association (BHA), American Hotel & Lodging Educational Institute (AH&LA), International and Euro CHRIE, West Coast University (WCU), International University of Business Agriculture and Technology (IUBAT) have signed agreements of collaboration with SWISS IM&H in 2012.

Academic programs 

It offers Undergraduate Programs in Culinary Management and Hospitality Management, and Postgraduate programs in Hospitality Management.

References

Business schools in Switzerland